John Sheridan may refer to:

Sports
John Sheridan (footballer) (born 1964), Irish footballer
John Sheridan (ice hockey) (born 1954), American ice hockey player 
John Sheridan (rugby league) (1933–2012), English rugby league footballer and coach
John B. Sheridan (1870–1930), Irish American sportswriter

Music
John Sheridan (jazz) (born 1946), American jazz pianist
John Henry Sheridan, American musician and composer

Politics
John Sheridan (New Jersey government official) (1942–2014), New Jersey government official
John Sheridan (New Brunswick politician) (1856–1932), Canadian politician in the Legislative Assembly of New Brunswick
John Donnelly Sheridan (died 1963), Irish politician
John E. Sheridan (politician) (1902–1987), U.S. Representative from Pennsylvania
John V. Sheridan (1879–1947), New York politician

Other people
John Sheridan (Royal Navy officer) (c. 1778–1862), vice-admiral of the Royal Navy
John D. Sheridan (1903–1980), Irish writer
John Emmet Sheridan (1877–1948), American illustrator
John F. Sheridan (1843–1908) Irish-American actor (pantomime dame) in Australia
John T. Sheridan, US Air Force officer
John Sheridan (editor) (1805–1858), editor of the London Morning Advertiser, migrated to South Australia 1849

Fictional characters
John Sheridan (Babylon 5), a character in the US TV science fiction series Babylon 5

See also
Jack Sheridan (disambiguation)